Kurt Wahle (26 December 1855 – 19 June 1928) was a Saxon general who travelled to German East Africa in 1914 to visit his son. Being in the colony at the outbreak of World War I, he volunteered to serve under Paul von Lettow-Vorbeck, despite outranking him, and became one of his front commanders. He was involved in the fighting during the East African Campaign until October 1918. During the campaign he was awarded the Iron Cross (Second and First Class) and commanded the German forces at the Battle of Tabora. He also was recommended for the order Pour le Mérite by von Lettow-Vorbeck, however the recommendation did not reach Germany before the war ended and thus was never approved or awarded.

References

 Paice, Edward Tip and Run: The Untold Tragedy of the Great War in Africa Weidenfeld & Nicolson, 2007, . (see page 384)

External links
  My reminiscences of East Africa by General von Lettow-Vorbeck

1855 births
1928 deaths
Colonial people of German East Africa
German prisoners of war in World War I
German Army generals of World War I
Lieutenant generals of Saxony
Recipients of the Iron Cross (1914), 1st class
World War I prisoners of war held by the United Kingdom
People from Nordsachsen
Military personnel from Saxony